Below is a list of lists of Indian cricketers.

By format

Men's team
 List of India Test cricketers
 List of India Test wicket-keepers
 List of India ODI cricketers
 List of India Twenty20 International cricketers
List of India Twenty-20 wicket-keepers

Women's team
 List of India women Test cricketers
 List of India women ODI cricketers
 List of India women Twenty20 International cricketers

By zone
 List of Central Zone cricketers
 List of East Zone cricketers
 List of North Zone cricketers
 List of South Zone cricketers
 List of West Zone cricketers

By state

Current domestic teams
 List of Andhra cricketers
 List of Arunachal Pradesh cricketers
 List of Assam cricketers
 List of Baroda cricketers
 List of Bengal cricketers
 List of Bihar cricketers
 List of Chandigarh cricketers
 List of Chhattisgarh cricketers
 List of Delhi cricketers
 List of Goa cricketers
 List of Gujarat cricketers
 List of Haryana cricketers
 List of Himachal Pradesh cricketers
 List of Hyderabad cricketers
 List of Jammu and Kashmir cricketers
 List of Jharkhand cricketers
 List of Karnataka cricketers
 List of Kerala cricketers
 List of Madhya Pradesh cricketers
 List of Maharashtra cricketers
 List of Manipur cricketers
 List of Meghalaya cricketers
 List of Mizoram cricketers
 List of Mumbai cricketers
 List of Nagaland cricketers
 List of Odisha cricketers
 List of Puducherry cricketers
 List of Punjab cricketers (India)
 List of Railways cricketers
 List of Rajasthan cricketers
 List of Saurashtra cricketers
 List of Services cricketers
 List of Sikkim cricketers
 List of Tamil Nadu cricketers
 List of Tripura cricketers
 List of Uttar Pradesh cricketers
 List of Vidarbha cricketers
 List of Uttarakhand cricketers

Defunct domestic teams
 List of Northern Punjab cricketers
 List of Southern Punjab cricketers
 List of Travancore-Cochin cricketers